The Masked Singer Ukraine (lit. Mask) is a Ukrainian reality singing competition television series based on the Masked Singer franchise which originated from the South Korean version of the show King of Mask Singer. It premiered on Ukraina TV channel on 16 January 2021.

Cast

Panellists and host

Following the announcement of the series, it was confirmed by Ukraina that a television presenter and stand-up comedian Volodymyr Ostapchuk will serve as the show's host.

On 29 December 2020, the permanent panel of celebrity detectives was announced, which is composed of singers Olya Polyakova, Dzidzio, Andriy Danylko, and NK. In the second episode of the show, they were joined by a pop singer Oleh Vynnyk, who self-eliminated himself under the guise of Buivol.

Series overview

Season 1

Guest appearances

Episodes

Week 1 (16 January)

Week 2 (30 January)

Week 3 (6 February)

Week 4 (13 February)

Week 5 (20 February)

Week 6 (27 February)

Week 7 (6 March)

Week 8 (13 March)

Week 9 (20 March)

Week 10 (27 March)

Week 11 - Semifinal (3 April)

Week 12 - Final (10 April) 
Special Performance: "Disco Kicks" by Verka Serduchka

Season 2

Guest appearances

Episodes

Week 1 (23 October) 
Group Performance: "The Greatest Show" from The Greatest Showman

Week 2 (30 October)

Week 3 (6 November)

Week 4 (13 November)

Week 5 (20 November)

Week 6 (27 November)

Week 7 (4 December)

Week 8 (11 December)

Week 9 - Semifinal (18 December)

Week 10 - Final (25 December)

New Year's Special (2021) 
Group Performance: «All I Want for Christmas Is You» by Mariah Carey

Notes

References

External links
 

Ukrainian reality television series
2021 Ukrainian television series debuts
Ukraine (TV channel) original programming